Lenhardt is a surname of Danube Swabians a tribe of Germanic peoples origin former Austria-Hungary. Notable people with the surname include:

Alfonso E. Lenhardt (born 1943), American diplomat
Don Lenhardt (1922–2014), American baseball player, scout, and coach
Michelle Lenhardt (born 1980), Brazilian swimmer
Lenhardt Airpark

History
The Lenhardt are a big Family who is divided in several branches, first recorded at High Middle Ages in Frankfurt, Hesse, from there members settled in Austro-Hungary between 1686 and 1829, from there many went to USA and other Countrys. After 1945 many was expelled to Austria and Germany, but also again some went to USA and other Countrys. Today this Family is intermingled also with other ethnicitys.

See also
Lenhart
Lienhardt

References